Sar-e Pol, also spelled Sari Pul, is one of the thirty-four provinces of Afghanistan, located in the north of the country. It borders Ghor and Bamyan to the south, Samangan to the east, Balkh and Jowzjan to the north, and Faryab to the west. The province is divided into 7 districts and contains 896 villages. It has a population of about 632,000, which is multi-ethnic and mostly a tribal society. The province was created in 1988, with the support of northern Afghan politician Sayed Nasim Mihanparast. The city of Sar-e Pol serves as the provincial capital.

In 2021, the Taliban gained control of the province during the 2021 Taliban offensive.

History

Between the early 16th century and the mid-18th century, the territory was ruled by the Khanate of Bukhara. It was given to Ahmad Shah Durrani by Murad Beg of Bukhara after a treaty was signed in or about 1750, and became part of the Durrani Empire. It was ruled by the Durranis followed by the Barakzai dynasty. The area was untouched by the British during the three Anglo-Afghan wars that were fought in the 19th and 20th centuries. It remained peaceful for about one hundred years until the 1980s Soviet–Afghan War.

Recent history
During the Afghan Civil War, the area was controlled by forces loyal to Abdul Rashid Dostum. It was captured by the Taliban in 1998. Aminullah Amin, the first senior member of the Taliban to be captured, was the former governor of the province.

Swedish-led Provincial Reconstruction Team (PRT), which has been based in Mazar-e Sharif since about 2005 and responsible for four provinces including Sar-e Pol, established an office and some troops in the province. The Afghan National Security Forces (ANFS) began expanding in the last decade and slowly took over security from International Security Assistance Force (ISAF). The Afghanistan-Turkmenistan border is maintained by the Afghan Border Police (ABP) while law and order for the rest of the province is provided by the NATO-trained Afghan National Police (ANP).

In 2009, the provincial Police Chief stated that weapons had been collected from many people and three districts, namely, Sangcharak, Gosfandi, and Sozama Qala areas termed as the peaceful districts of the province. In operations against militants, the police chief said they had arrested a prominent Taliban commander Mullah Nader along with 11 other people during the recent operations. He said scores of kilograms of hashish and opium had also been seized from people during the operations.

The biggest threat to travelers in Sar-e Pol province remains highway bandits and thieves, corrupt militiamen and police, and road hazards. The Taliban have small cadres operating throughout the province but rely on larger support networks in neighboring provinces.

On August 8, 2021, the Taliban regained control of the provincial capitol.

Healthcare

The percentage of households with clean drinking water increased from 8% in 2005 to 15% in 2011.
The percentage of births attended to by a skilled birth attendant increased from 0% in 2005 to 20% in 2011.

Education

The overall literacy rate (6+ years of age) increased from 12% in 2005 to 23% in 2011. 
The overall net enrolment rate (6–13 years of age) increased from 22% in 2005 to 46% in 2011.

Geography

Sar-e Pol is a mountainous province, especially in its southern part. It covers an area of 16,360 km. Three quarters (75%) of the province is mountainous or semi mountainous terrain while one-seventh (14%) of the area is made up of flat land. The province is divided into 7 districts, containing 896 of villages.

Demography

As of 2021, the total population of the province is about 632,000. The Province is multi ethnic. Inhabitants are Hazara, Uzbek, Tajik, Pashtun, and Turkmen

Economy

Mining and agriculture are the main industries of the province. The Government of Afghanistan signed a deal with China National Petroleum Corporation (CNPC) for the development of oil blocks in the Amu Darya basin, a project expected to earn billions of dollars over two decades; the deal covers drilling and a refinery in the northern provinces of Sar-e Pol and Faryab and is the first international oil production agreement entered into by the Afghan government for several decades. Production of the Afghan oil began in October 2012, which was expected to increase to 1 million barrels per year in 2013.

On October 5, 2018, in Washington, D.C., Afghan officials signed a 30-year contract involving a $56 million investment by investment group Centar and its operating company Afghan Gold and Minerals Co. for exploration of an area covering 500 square km for copper, with development of mining due to begin thereafter.

Communications in and around the province are provided by Afghan Wireless, Roshan, Etisalat, and MTN Group.

See also
 Sar-e Pol city
 Sar-e Pol District

References

External links

 
Provinces of Afghanistan
1988 establishments in Afghanistan
Hazarajat
Provinces of the Islamic Republic of Afghanistan